The Aldan mine is a large iron mine located in eastern Russia in the Sakha Republic. Aldan represents one of the largest iron ore reserves in Russia and in the world,  having estimated reserves of 2 billion tonnes of ore grading 47% iron metal.

References 

Iron mines in Russia
Mines in the Soviet Union